The Turespaña Masters was a European Tour golf tournament which was played from 1992 to 2000 in several different regions of Spain. Turespaña is the Spanish national tourism authority, and it sponsored several golf tournaments in the 1980s and 1990s to promote Spain's role as a major warm weather golfing holiday destination in Europe. The winners of the Turespaña Masters included the major championship winners Vijay Singh and José María Olazábal. The prize fund fluctuated, but was generally below average for a European Tour event.

Winners

External links
Coverage on the European Tour's official site

Former European Tour events
Golf tournaments in Spain
Defunct sports competitions in Spain